Rank comparison chart of Non-commissioned officer and enlisted ranks for air forces of Hispanophone states.

Other ranks

See also
Comparative air force enlisted ranks of the Americas
Ranks and insignia of NATO air forces enlisted

References

Military ranks of Hispanophone countries 
Military comparisons